Charles Stephen (7 May 1930 – February 2002) was an Indian hockey player. He participated in the 1956 Summer Olympics and won a gold medal.

References

External links

Olympic field hockey players of India
Field hockey players at the 1956 Summer Olympics
Indian male field hockey players
Anglo-Indian people
Olympic medalists in field hockey
Medalists at the 1956 Summer Olympics
Olympic gold medalists for India
1930 births
2002 deaths
Field hockey players from Lahore
Indian emigrants to England
British people of Anglo-Indian descent